Nayanar (meaning "the Nayar") is an honorific title used by sub-castes of the Nair community from North Kerala, India. It can be used by Nair families but also a generic term to refer to a Nair

Position in society
The Nayanars were Samanthans, Kiryathils , illathu nairs and Naduvazhi (chiefs of chiefdoms and aristocrats) and Jenmimar (landed gentry).

See also
Pillai (Kerala title)
Mannadiyar
Madampi

References

Indian surnames
Nair